Texas is a state of the United States.

Texas may also refer to:

Places

United States
 Republic of Texas, a 1836–1846 sovereign nation in North America
 Texas, Alabama, an unincorporated community
 Texas, Georgia, an unincorporated community
 Texas, Kentucky, an unincorporated community
 Texas, Mississippi, an unincorporated community
 Texas, New Jersey, an unincorporated community
 Texas, New York, a hamlet
 Texas, Ohio, an unincorporated community
 Texas, West Virginia, an unincorporated community
 Texas, Wisconsin, a town
 Texas City, Illinois, an unincorporated community
 Texas City, Texas, a municipality
 Texas County (disambiguation)
 Texas Township (disambiguation)
 Texas Canyon, a canyon in Cochise County, Arizona
 Texas District, a district of the Lutheran Church
 Texas Valley, a valley in Georgia
 Texas Avenue, a section of Texas State Highway 6 in the College Station-Bryan metropolitan area

Elsewhere
 35352 Texas, an asteroid
 Texas, a refugee camp and now permanent settlement in Calbuco, Chile
 Texas, Queensland, a town in Australia
 Texas Downs, a cattle station in Western Australia

Arts and entertainment
 Texas (novel), by James A. Michener

Film and television
 Texas (2005 film), an Italian movie
 Texas (1941 film), a Western starring William Holden and Glenn Ford
 "Texas" (SpongeBob SquarePants), episode 18 (2000) of the animated TV series
 James A. Michener's Texas, a 1994 TV movie based on the eponymous novel; starring Benjamin Bratt, Patrick Duffy
 Texas (TV series), a 1980s American television program
 Texas John Slaughter (TV series), based on Texas John Slaughter (John Horton Slaughter)

Military
 USS Texas, the name of a number of ships of the United States Navy
 CSS Texas, a twin-screw ironclad ram of the Confederate Navy

Music
 Texas (band), a Scottish rock band
 Texas (musical), produced annually in Canyon, Texas, US
 Texas (PlayRadioPlay! album), 2008
 Texas (Lasse Stefanz album), 2010
 "Texas (When I Die)", a song by Ed Bruce
 "Texas", a song by Big Black from the EP Bulldozer
 "Texas", a single by Charlie Daniels from the album Nightrider
 "Texas", a song by George Strait from the album Somewhere Down in Texas
 "Texas" (Chris Rea song), a 1990 single from the album Water Sign
 "Texas", a song by Chris Rea from the 1983 album The Road to Hell
 "Texas", a song by The Highwaymen from the album Highwayman 2
 "Texas, Qld 4385", a song by Lee Kernaghan from the 2002 album Electric Rodeo
 "Texas", a song by Allan Holdsworth from the 2000 album The Sixteen Men of Tain

Transportation
 The Texas (locomotive), a steam locomotive involved in the American Civil War Great Locomotive Chase
 2-10-4 or Texas-type, a class of locomotive
 Texas (steamboat), a structure or section of a steamboat or ship

People
 Hasinai, Tejas or Texas, a Native American people after whom the state was named
 Alger "Texas" Alexander (1900–1954), American blues singer
 Einar "Texas" Ljungberg (1880–1974), Swedish socialist leader
 John Horton Slaughter (Texas John Slaughter, 1841–1922), American Old West lawman, poker player, cowboy and rancher
 Texas Jack Vermillion (1842–1911), American Old West gunfighter
 Texas Battle (born 1980), American actor
 Texas Gladden (1895–1967), American folk singer
 Texas Ruby, stage name of pioneering country music female vocalist Ruby Agnes Owens (1908–1963)
 Texas Terri, punk rock singer and songwriter born Terri Laird in 1955
 T. Texas Tyler, stage name of American country music singer and songwriter David Luke Myrick (1916–1972)
 Alexis Texas (born 1985), American pornographic actress

Other uses
 University of Texas at Austin, a research university
 Texas transfer, a contract bridge bidding convention
 Texas Homecare, a former chain of DIY stores in the UK

See also
 
 
 Tex (disambiguation)
 Texan (disambiguation)

Lists of people by nickname